Skaistgiriai ('bright woods') is a village in Kėdainiai district municipality, in Kaunas County, in central Lithuania. According to the 2011 census, the village had a population of 239 people. There are library, forestry and former school in Skaistgiriai.

History
The village has been established during the Interwar. During the Soviet era it was a center of the "New Life" kolkhoz.

Demography

Images

References

Villages in Kaunas County
Kėdainiai District Municipality